Zvasiya is a surname. Notable people with the surname include:

Lincoln Zvasiya (born 1991), Zimbabwean footballer
Lloyd Zvasiya (born 1981), Zimbabwean sprinter

Surnames of African origin